Sigurd Synnestvedt Monssen (10 October 1902 – 7 November 1990) was a Norwegian rowing coxswain and Olympic medalist. He received a bronze medal in men's eight at the 1948 Summer Olympics, as a member of the Norwegian team.

References

1902 births
1990 deaths
Norwegian male rowers
Olympic rowers of Norway
Rowers at the 1948 Summer Olympics
Olympic bronze medalists for Norway
Olympic medalists in rowing
Medalists at the 1948 Summer Olympics
Coxswains (rowing)